Evan Daniel Susser (born December 1, 1985) is an American comedy writer and television producer.  He was the co-writer of the film Fist Fight. He also is a writer and producer for the NBC primetime series Brooklyn Nine-Nine.

Personal life 
Susser is Jewish. He married Jamie Rebecca Hanley in 2014.

Filmography

Fist Fight 
Susser wrote the 2017 feature film Fist Fight with co-writers Max Greenfield and Van Robichaux.

Wedding Crashers 2
Susser is writing the upcoming sequel to Wedding Crashers, Wedding Crashers 2, with writing partner Van Robichaux.

Brooklyn Nine-Nine 

 7.06: "Trying"
 8.04: "Balancing"

Podcasting 

Susser is a frequent on air contributor to the Doughboys podcast, and the host of The Deli Boys with fellow Brooklyn Nine-Nine writer David Phillips.

References

External links 

 

1985 births
American television writers
American male television writers
American television producers
Living people
Screenwriters from Washington, D.C.
Washington University in St. Louis alumni